Qez Qaleh may refer to:

Castles 
 Qez Qaleh Si, Abadeh
 Qez Qaleh Si, Bileh Savar

Residential places 
 Qez Qaleh, Markazi
 Qez Qaleh, Qazvin
 Qez Qaleh, Khoy, West Azerbaijan Province
 Qez Qaleh, Miandoab, West Azerbaijan Province
 Qez Qaleh, Showt, West Azerbaijan Province